Poet's Seat Tower is a 1912 sandstone observation tower, located in Greenfield, Massachusetts.  It was so named to honor a long tradition of poets being drawn to the spot, in particular, the local poet Frederick Goddard Tuckerman.  By 1850, the location was referred to as "Poet's Seat" by Tuckerman in a surviving herbarium entry for November 10 of that year.

An earlier wooden tower was erected at the site on June 3, 1879. This first structure was built, along with a public drinking fountain and a road accessing the site, under the auspices of The Greenfield Rural Club.

References

External links
Photographs of and from Poet's Seat Tower

Buildings and structures in Franklin County, Massachusetts
Monuments and memorials in Massachusetts
Towers in Massachusetts
Observation towers in the United States
Greenfield, Massachusetts
Towers completed in 1912
1912 establishments in Massachusetts